"To a Wreath of Snow" is a poem written by Emily Brontë in December 1837. The poem was penned the same month Anne Brontë fell ill and had to be taken care of by her sister, Charlotte Brontë, who was working as a teacher.

Analysis 

"To a Wreath of Snow" features Brontë writing from the point of view of the 
character Augusta Almeda, the Queen of Gondal. Gondal was a fantasy world created by Emily and Anne Brontë three years previously. The context in which this poem was written suggests that Emily Brontë was attempting to escape the reality of her sister's illness by falling back into the fantasy world they created together.

Brontë describes the snow as a "transient voyager of heaven" and "angel like," suggesting that she sees the snow as coming directly from God. In addition, the fact that the poem is addressed to the snow, gives it status. This is then reinforced when she describes the mountains as "crowned" in snow. When Brontë was alive, royalty was seen to be chosen by God and so the imagery of the mountains portrays the snow as being a gift from God. The concept of preciousness is strengthened by the adjectives "crowned" and "silvery."

Sibilance is used most successfully in stanzas one and five. The writer uses sibilance to imitate the sound and atmosphere which she is describing. In stanza one, she is imitating the "silent sign" and in stanza five she is trying to create a serene atmosphere that is "soft" and "sweetly spoke" by using the soft "s" sound repeatedly.

Brontë uses punctuation throughout to emphasize her meaning. The first two lines of stanza one both begin with "O" and end with an exclamation mark which suggests that these lines are bursts of Augusta's (and therefore possibly the author's) emotions. Brontë also develops caesura in the first line of stanza four. By combining repetition and the comma in "For many a week, and many a day", Brontë mimics the length that she is describing.

Juxtaposition and contrasting imagery are used effectively in stanza four to conclude the poem. Brontë makes a metaphor of Augusta's heart "sinking" when the morning "rose." This visualizes for the reader that when one characterized object descends, another ascends. Brontë suggests that to compensate for God's gift of the snow falling, Anne's life has to be given back to God.

References

1837 poems
Poetry by Emily Brontë